Bagaraatan (/'ba-ɣa-raa-tan/ meaning 'small' baɣa + 'carnivorous animal, beast of prey' araatan in Mongolian) is a genus of theropod dinosaur from the Late Cretaceous period. Its fossils were found in the Nemegt Formation of Mongolia. Bagaraatan may have been around 3 to 4 metres (9.8 to 13 ft) in length.

The type species, B. ostromi, was described by Osmolska in 1996. The post-cranial (ZPAL MgD-I/108) skeleton has been described as "bird-like", while the skull exhibits features of several different theropod groups.

Classification

Holtz classified Bagaraatan as a basal tyrannosauroid, Coria identified it as a troodontid, and Rauhut placed it in Maniraptora. Mark Loewen et al. placed it in basal Tyrannosauroidea, agreeing with the placement by Holtz.

Below is the cladogram by Loewen et al. in 2013.

References

Sources
 Osmolska, H. (1996). "An unusual theropod dinosaur from the Late Cretaceous Nemegt Formation of Mongolia". Acta Palaeontologica Polonica 41; 1-38

External links 
 Dinosaur Mailing List entry which discusses the genus

Tyrannosaurs
Maastrichtian life
Late Cretaceous dinosaurs of Asia
Cretaceous Mongolia
Fossils of Mongolia
Nemegt fauna
Fossil taxa described in 1996
Taxa named by Halszka Osmólska